The Department of Customs and Excise was an Australian government department that existed between January 1956 and March 1975.

Scope
Information about the department's functions and/or government funding allocation could be found in the Administrative Arrangements Orders, the annual Portfolio Budget Statements and in the department's annual reports.

In the 23 April 1958 Administrative Arrangements Order, the department's functions were:
Duties of Customs and Excise
Bounties on the production or export of goods.

Structure
The department was a Commonwealth Public Service department, staffed by officials who were responsible to the Minister for Customs and Excise.

References

Ministries established in 1956
Customs and Excise